Francisco José Ribas (1764–1828) was a Venezuelan Roman Catholic priest and philosopher.

1764 births
1828 deaths
Venezuelan Roman Catholic priests
Venezuelan philosophers
Venezuelan people of Canarian descent
Venezuelan people of Spanish descent